Nagina (Hindi: नगीना) is a 2014 Indian, Bhojpuri language film directed and produced by Rajkumar R. Pandey, and associate directed by Manoj R Pandey, starring Pradeep Pandey "Chintu", Rinku Ghosh. This film is a sequel of the Bhojpuri film Naagin.

Plot

Cast
Pradeep Pandey "Chintu"
Rinku Ghosh
Sambhavna Seth as item number

Soundtrack

References

External links
 

2014 films
Indian action films
2010s Hindi-language films
2010s Bhojpuri-language films
Films directed by Rajkumar R. Pandey
2014 action films
Films about snakes
Films about shapeshifting